Amt Burg (Spreewald) is an Amt ("collective municipality") in the district of Spree-Neiße, in Brandenburg, Germany. Its seat is in Burg (Spreewald).

The Amt Burg (Spreewald) consists of the following municipalities:
Briesen
Burg
Dissen-Striesow
Guhrow
Schmogrow-Fehrow
Werben

Demography

References 

Burg
Spree-Neiße